MOA-2007-BLG-197Lb is a brown dwarf discovered in August 2015 by the MOA collaboration. It is the first brown dwarf found by the microlensing method to orbit a solar-type star.

References

Exoplanets discovered in 2015
Exoplanets detected by microlensing
Brown dwarfs